The 1984 Masters (officially the 1984 Benson & Hedges Masters) was a professional non-ranking snooker tournament that took place between 22 and 29 January 1984 at the Wembley Conference Centre. The Masters, in its 10th year, changed the format into a championship for the game's top 16 ranked players. The BBC extended their television coverage to show all 8 days of the event and the prize money was more than double that of the previous year.

Defending champion Cliff Thorburn lost to John Spencer in the first round, but it was fellow Canadian Kirk Stevens' maximum break against Jimmy White in the 9th frame of their semi-final, for which the tournament is perhaps best remembered. The break earned Stevens £10,000 for the 147, £1,000 for the highest break, and a gold award for breaking the tournament record. It was Stevens' second maximum break, the other being made in a practice session, and only the 3rd ever televised 147 break by any player. "I couldn't believe how I felt. I was just enthralled in it, lost in it" Stevens said. Meanwhile, White won the match 6–4 with a 119 break in the next frame and went on to win his only Masters title. In front of his home crowd he beat Welshman Terry Griffiths by 9 frames to 5, playing in his fourth Masters final in five years.

Field
Defending champion Cliff Thorburn was the number 1 seed with World Champion Steve Davis seeded 2. The remaining places were allocated to the top 16 players in the world rankings. Tony Knowles was making his debut in the Masters.

Main draw

Final

Century breaks
Total: 6
 147, 105  Kirk Stevens
 119, 113  Jimmy White
 112  Ray Reardon
 100  Doug Mountjoy

References

1984
Masters Snooker
Masters Snooker
Masters Snooker